Anais Granofsky (born May 14, 1973) is a Canadian actress, screenwriter, producer and director. She is best known for portraying Lucy Fernandez in the Degrassi Junior High and Degrassi High series.

Early life
Granofsky was born in Springfield, Ohio, to an African American mother and a Canadian father of Romanian Jewish descent. Her paternal grandfather is industrialist Phil Granovsky.

Career 
She began her career as a child actor in 1985 playing Sophie of the Mighty Mites on "Owl TV". After that, she was cast in the Canadian children's television series The Kids of Degrassi Street.

From 1987 to 1991, Granofsky portrayed Lucy Fernandez in both Degrassi Junior High and Degrassi High. She also appeared in the 1992 series finale television movie School's Out. Granofsky has since made guest appearances in television series including Counterstrike, Forever Knight, and Goosebumps.

After Degrassi, she moved to New York to attend film school at NYU, then returned to Toronto where she acted in film and TV for the next decade. In 1997, she co-starred in the short-lived series Fast Track, starring Keith Carradine. She had recurring roles on La Femme Nikita and Soul Food.

In addition to acting, Granofsky has written and directed several films including On Their Knees (in which she also starred) and The Limb Salesman. She has directed episodes of Degrassi: The Next Generation, Bliss and Da Kink in My Hair.

Granofsky is married to husband, Craig, and has three children.

Filmography

References

External links

Northern Stars entry for Anais Granofsky

1973 births
Living people
20th-century Canadian actresses
21st-century Canadian actresses
Actresses from Ohio
Actresses from Toronto
African-American actresses
African-American Jews
American emigrants to Canada
Black Canadian actresses
Canadian child actresses
Canadian film actresses
Film producers from Ontario
Canadian people of African-American descent
Canadian people of Romanian-Jewish descent
Canadian television actresses
Canadian television directors
Canadian women film directors
Canadian women film producers
Canadian women screenwriters
Film directors from Ohio
Film directors from Toronto
Writers from Springfield, Ohio
Writers from Toronto
Canadian women television directors
20th-century African-American people
20th-century African-American women